Alain Maiki (born March 29, 1977) is a Venezuelan-American director and producer. Maiki, a former music producer and composer, began his film career in 2009, with a fast-paced success in the independent film industry.

Maiki has been emerging as a filmmaker-producer with his first short film titled Harmony, followed by his debut feature film "Devuélveme La Vida" released in Venezuela in January 2016 and earning a noticeable success among a few international film festivals. Followed by his debut feature, he now has finished his second feature titled UMA a drama/love story shot in Italy and currently under post-production that will be released in 2017 in at least three countries and two continents. In addition, Maiki is gaining interest for future feature film production for 2017 and 2018.

References 

1977 births
Living people
Venezuelan film directors
Place of birth missing (living people)